Felix Campbell (February 28, 1829 – November 8, 1902) was an American businessman and politician who served four terms as a United States representative from New York from 1883 to 1891.

Biography 
Born in Brooklyn, he attended the common schools and became a manufacturer of iron pipe and a consulting engineer. He was president of the board of supervisors in 1858 and was appointed by Governor Tilden a member of the board of commissioners from New York to the Centennial Exhibition at Philadelphia in 1876.

Congress 
Campbell was elected as a Democrat to the Forty-eighth and to the three succeeding Congresses, holding office from March 4, 1883, to March 3, 1891.

Death 
He declined to be a candidate for renomination in 1890 and in 1902 died in Brooklyn. Interment was in Holy Cross Cemetery.

References

1829 births
1902 deaths
Politicians from Brooklyn
Camblell, Felix
Democratic Party members of the United States House of Representatives from New York (state)
19th-century American politicians